Garland Perry "Hank" Cochran (August 2, 1935 – July 15, 2010) was an American country music singer and songwriter. Starting during the 1960s, Cochran was a prolific songwriter in the genre, including major hits by Patsy Cline, Ray Price, Eddy Arnold, and others. Cochran was also a recording artist between 1962 and 1980, scoring seven times on the Billboard country music charts, with his greatest solo success being the No. 20 "Sally Was a Good Old Girl." In 2014, he was inducted into the Country Music Hall of Fame.

Biography 
Hank Cochran was born August 2, 1935, in Isola, Mississippi, during the Great Depression. By the time he turned three, Cochran already had pneumonia, whooping cough, measles, and mumps. The doctor feared he wouldn't survive to adulthood. His parents divorced when he was nine years old. He then moved with his father to Memphis, Tennessee, and was placed in an orphanage. After running away twice, he then was sent to live with his grandparents, in Greenville, Mississippi. His uncle Otis Cochran taught him to play the guitar as the pair hitchhiked from Mississippi to southeastern New Mexico to work in the oilfields. After returning to Mississippi as a teenager, Cochran went to California and picked olives. While there, he formed The Cochran Brothers, a duo with unrelated Eddie Cochran.

In 1960 at the age of 24, he hitchhiked for Hollywood, but ended up going to Nashville, and teamed with Harlan Howard to write the song "I Fall to Pieces". It became a major success for Patsy Cline (recorded November 16, 1960), reaching No. 1 on the Billboard country music charts and No. 12 on the Billboard Hot 100 (chart for all music categories). Cline also recorded Cochran's "She's Got You" (recorded December 17, 1961, it was another major hit, No. 1 on the country charts and No. 14 on the Hot 100), and "Why Can't He Be You" (recorded September 5, 1962).

In 1960, during a date at a movie theater, the film inspired him to compose a new song. He left the theater quickly, and by the time he got home fifteen minutes later, composed "Make the World Go Away." Ray Price recorded the song, and it scored No. 2 on the Billboard country charts in 1963. The next year Eddy Arnold, who recorded it in as a pop-oriented Nashville Sound arrangement, made the song his signature hit and one of the biggest sellers in country music history, scoring No. 1 on the country music charts, then in 1965 No. 6 on the overall Billboard Hot 100 charts (his highest rated song ever). Arnold also recorded the song "I Want to Go with You". 

Cochran wrote several successful songs sung by Burl Ives ("A Little Bitty Tear", "Funny Way of Laughin'", "The Same Old Hurt"). He also wrote songs for George Strait ("The Chair" with Dean Dillon and "Ocean Front Property" with Dillon and Royce Porter), Keith Whitley ("Miami, My Amy" also with Dillon and Porter), Merle Haggard ("It's Not Love (But It's Not Bad)"), "Don't You Ever Get Tired (of Hurting Me)", a No. 1 scoring record for Ronnie Milsap, and Mickey Gilley ("That's All That Matters").

While working at publishing company Pamper Music, some evenings, he performed in a Nashville tavern named Tootsie's Orchid Lounge. While there, he noticed an amazing new talent. He encouraged management to contract the young songwriter, Willie Nelson, giving Nelson a raise owed to him at the time.

Two of his fondest memories were working with Natalie Cole (among other artists) on a 2003 tribute album to Patsy Cline (Remembering Patsy Cline), because of his love for her father Nat King Cole, and his collaboration with Vern Gosdin for the 1988 album Chiseled in Stone (Gosdin's highest rated album at No. 7).

In 2008, singer Lea Anne Creswell came to Cochran's home to choose songs for a new album, subsequently called Lea Anne Sings Hank Cochran and ....

Marriages 
Cochran was married five times. His fourth wife was country music vocalist Jeannie Seely. They were married twelve years and divorced in 1981. In 1982, he married his fifth wife Suzi and they were married until his death in 2010.

Death 
Cochran had surgery for pancreatic cancer in July 2008. In April 2010, he had a second surgery to remove and repair a grapefruit sized aortic aneurysm. Cochran's health did not improve, and he died on July 15, 2010, at age 74.

Tributes 
In October 2012, singer Jamey Johnson released Living for a Song: A Tribute to Hank Cochran, featuring his renditions of sixteen Cochran compositions.

Awards and honors 
Awards and honors include:
1967: Walkway of Stars – Country Music Association
1974: Nashville Songwriters Hall of Fame
2003: Mississippi Music Hall of Fame
2014: Country Music Hall of Fame inductee

Artist recordings 
Notable artists who have recorded Hank Cochran songs include:

Discography

Albums

Singles

References 
Oermann, Robert K. (1998). – "Hank Cochran". – The Encyclopedia of Country Music. – Paul Kingsbury, Editor. – New York: Oxford University Press. – pp. 101–2. –

External links 
Official website

Interview with Hank Cochran in International Songwriters Association's "Songwriter Magazine"

1935 births
2010 deaths
American male singer-songwriters
American country singer-songwriters
Deaths from cancer in Tennessee
Deaths from pancreatic cancer
People from Humphreys County, Mississippi
People from Nashville, Tennessee
Ekko Records artists
Cash Records artists
RCA Victor artists
Liberty Records artists
Monument Records artists
Singer-songwriters from Tennessee
Singer-songwriters from Mississippi
Country Music Hall of Fame inductees
Country musicians from Tennessee
Country musicians from Mississippi